Meher Ramesh is an Indian film director and screenwriter who predominantly works for Telugu films. Ramesh debuted as a director with the Kannada film Veera Kannadiga (2004) which was simultaneously made in Telugu as Andhrawala (2004), and has made films like Ajay (2006), a Kannada film which was remake of Okkadu (2003). He then directed Telugu films Kantri (2008) and Shakti (2011) with NTR, Billa (2009) with Prabhas and Shadow (2013) with Venkatesh.

Filmography

As an actor

As a director

References

External links
 

21st-century Indian film directors
Living people
Kannada film directors
Telugu film directors
Artists from Vijayawada
Film directors from Andhra Pradesh
1976 births